Monty Holmes (born in Lubbock, Texas) is an American country music singer-songwriter. Holmes signed to Bang II Records and released his debut album, All I Ever Wanted, in 1998. His highest charting single, "Why'd You Start Lookin' So Good," peaked at number 43 in 1998. Holmes' songs have been recorded by George Strait ("When Did You Stop Loving Me," "I Know She Still Loves Me," "Troubadour") and Lee Ann Womack ("Never Again, Again").

Discography

Albums

Singles

Music videos

References

American country singer-songwriters
American male singer-songwriters
Living people
Singer-songwriters from Texas
People from Lubbock, Texas
Country musicians from Texas
Year of birth missing (living people)